Steven Wesley Gilland is a United States Army lieutenant general who serves as the 61st superintendent of the United States Military Academy since June 27, 2022. He most recently served as the deputy commanding general for maneuver of III Corps from July 2021 to June 2022, and prior to that was commanding general of the 2nd Infantry Division from 2019 to 2021.

Early life and education
A native of Rock Island, Illinois, Gilland graduated from Sherrard High School in 1986. He has a B.S. degree from the United States Military Academy and a M.S. degree in military operational art and science from the Air Force Command and Staff College.

Military career
Gilland was commissioned from United States Military Academy at West Point in 1990. In 2012, Gilland took command of the 1st "Ironhorse" Brigade Combat Team. Gilland was promoted to the rank of brigadier general in June 2015. He had previously participated in numerous deployments to the Middle East, Africa and Afghanistan. He served as the 77th Commandant of Cadets of the United States Military Academy from June 2017 to July 2019, and then became commanding general of the 2nd Infantry Division, serving from July 17, 2019 to May 18, 2021.

Around January 2021, the Office of the Chief of Staff of the Army announced that Gilland would become the deputy commander of III Corps at Fort Hood. He assumed the position on July 22, 2021, and served until June 8, 2022.

In May 2022, Gilland was nominated for promotion to lieutenant general and confirmed in June. He assumed office as the 61st Superintendent of the United States Military Academy on June 27, 2022, succeeding Darryl A. Williams.

Awards and decorations
Gilland's awards and decorations include the Army Distinguished Service Medal, Defense Superior Service Medal, Legion of Merit, Bronze Star Medal, Defense Meritorious Service Medal, Meritorious Service Medal, Army Commendation Medal with V Device, Military Free Fall Jumpmaster Badge and the Combat Infantryman Badge.

References

Year of birth missing (living people)
Living people
People from Rock Island County, Illinois
United States Military Academy alumni
Air Command and Staff College alumni
Recipients of the Legion of Merit
United States Army generals
Recipients of the Distinguished Service Medal (US Army)
Recipients of the Defense Superior Service Medal
Military personnel from Illinois
Superintendents of the United States Military Academy